The 2000 Pan American Women's Handball Championship was the sixth edition of the Pan American Women's Handball Championship, held in Brazil from 31 October to 5 November 2000. It acted as the American qualifying tournament for the 2001 World Women's Handball Championship.

Standings

Results
All times are local (UTC−3).

Games of Greenland

Final ranking

References

External links
Results on todor66.com

2000 Women
American Women's Handball Championship
Pan
2000 in Brazilian women's sport
October 2000 sports events in South America
November 2000 sports events in South America